Bobgunnia is a genus of flowering plants in the legume family, Fabaceae. It belongs to the subfamily Faboideae. The genus is named for Charles R. Gunn who was the director of the U.S. National Seed Herbarium for many years before his retirement.

References

Swartzieae
Fabaceae genera